
Ritter is a surname, and may refer to:

People

A
 Alexander Ritter (1833–1896), German composer, violinist, and conductor
Alison Ritter, Australian drug policy academic
 August Ritter (civil engineer) (1826–1908), German civil engineer
 August Gottfried Ritter (1811–1885), German romantic composer and organist

B
 Bill Ritter (born 1956), American politician and former Governor of Colorado
 Bill Ritter (journalist) (born 1950), American news anchor in New York City
 Bruce Ritter (1927–1999), American Roman Catholic priest, founder of Covenant House
 Burwell C. Ritter (1810–1880), American politician, Congressman from Kentucky 1865–1867

C
 Carl Ritter (1779–1859), German geographer
 Christian Ritter (1645–50 – after 1725), German composer and organist
 Christian Ritter (footballer) (born 1984), German football player

D
 Dominik Ritter (born 1989), Swiss football player
 Donald L. Ritter (born 1940), American politician, Congressman from Pennsylvania 1980–1993

E
 Erika Ritter (born 1948), Canadian playwright and humorist

F
 Floyd Ritter (1870–1943), Major League Baseball catcher 1890
 Frédéric Louis Ritter (1834–1891), German-American composer and author
 Friedrich Ritter (1898–1989), German botanist, expert on cacti

G
 Gerhard Ritter (1888–1967), German conservative historian
 Gerhard A. Ritter (1929–2015), German historian
 Gretchen Ritter, American academic administrator

H
 Halsted L. Ritter (1868–1951), American jurist impeached and removed from office in 1936
 Heinrich Ritter (1791–1869), German philosopher
 Henry Ritter (1816–1853), Canadian genre painter

J
 Jason Ritter (born 1980), American actor, son of John Ritter
 Jeannie Ritter (born 1958), former First Lady of Colorado, US; wife of former Governor Bill Ritter
 Johann Christian Ritter (1755–1810), first printer in South Africa
 Johann Wilhelm Ritter (1776–1810), German chemist and physicist
 Johannes Ritter (born 1995), Danish footballer
 John Ritter (congressman) (1779–1851), American politician, Congressman from Pennsylvania 1843–1847
 John Ritter (1948–2003), American actor, son of Tex Ritter, father of Jason Ritter
 John H. Ritter (born 1951), American young-adult baseball novelist
 John Steele Ritter, American pianist, long-term collaborator of French flautist Jean-Pierre Rampal
 Joseph Ritter (1892–1967), American Cardinal, Archbishop of Saint Louis 1946–1967
 Josh Ritter (born 1976), American singer-songwriter

K
 Krysten Ritter (born 1981), American actress

L
 Lawrence Ritter (1922–2004), American baseball writer
 Lorenz Ritter (1832–1921), German painter
 Lou Ritter (1925–2010), American politician, mayor of Jacksonville, Florida 1965–1967
 Louise Ritter (born 1958), American track and field athlete, Olympic gold medalist

M
Matthew Ritter, American politician
Maya Ritter (born 1993), Canadian actress

N
 Nikolaus Ritter (1899–1974), German Intelligence Officer

O
 Ole Ritter (born 1941), Danish professional cyclist

P
 Paul  Ritter (1966–2021), British stage and screen actor
 Paul Ritter (architect) (1925–2010), Australian architect, artist and author
 Paul Ritter (painter) (1829–1907), German architectural painter and etcher
 Paul Ritter (diplomat) (1865–1921), Swiss ambassador to the United States
 Preston Ritter (1949–2015), American rock drummer

R
 Rex Ritter, lead guitarist for the American band Jessamine 1994–1998
 Robert Ritter (1901 – c. 1951), German psychologist whose work led to the genocide of the Roma people in Nazi Germany

S
 Scott Ritter (born 1961), chief United Nations weapons inspector in Iraq 1991–1998
 Sylvester Ritter (1952–1998), ring name Junkyard Dog, American professional wrestler

T
 Tex Ritter (1905–1974), American singer and actor, father of John Ritter
 Thelma Ritter (1902–1969), American actress
 Tyson Ritter (born 1984), American musician, lead singer and bassist for The All-American Rejects

W
 William Ritter (1867–1955), Swiss writer
 William Emerson Ritter (1856–1944), American biologist
 William M. Ritter (1864–1952), American businessman

Others
 Mary Ritter Beard (1876–1958), American historian and campaigner for woman's suffrage
 F. Ritter Shumway (1906–1992), major figure in American figure skating
 Albert Ritter Conti v. Cedassamare (1887–1967), Italian-American character actor
 Pavao Ritter Vitezović (1652–1713), Croatian writer, historian, linguist, and publisher
 Stephen Geoffreys (born 1964), American actor who used the screen name Sam Ritter in pornographic films

Fictional characters
 Donald & Deborah Ritter, characters from Marvel Comics
 Philip Ritter, a doctor played by Paul Henreid in the 1952 film Stolen Face
 Rein Weiss Ritter, a robot in the Super Robot Wars series
 Rhonda Ritter, a character in the 1982 film Grease 2
 Robert (Bob) Ritter, fictional CIA Deputy Director of Operations in the Tom Clancy novel Clear and Present Danger (1989)
 The same character, played by Henry Czerny, in the 1994 film adaptation of the novel
 Weiss Ritter, a robot in the Super Robot Wars series
 Alwin Ritter, a fictional character in the anime Gundam SEED DESTINY
 Thomas, Jacob, and Lily Ritter, characters from the 2013 video game State of Decay

See also
 Ritter (titular name)
 Rebecca Ritters (born 1984), Australian actress

Occupational surnames
German-language surnames
Surnames of German origin

cs:Ritter
es:Ritter
fr:Ritter
pt:Ritter

Surnames of Liechtenstein origin